The boys' pole vault competition at the 2010 Youth Olympic Games was held on 19–23 August 2010 in Bishan Stadium.

Schedule

Results

Qualification

Finals

Final B

Final A

External links
 iaaf.org - Men's pole vault
 

Athletics at the 2010 Summer Youth Olympics